Lennox Cooper (date of birth unknown) is a former West Indian cricketer. Cooper's batting style is unknown, though it is known he bowled right-arm fast. He was born on Montserrat.

Cooper first played for Montserrat against St Kitts in the 1970 Hesketh Bell Shield. In 1971, he made a single first-class appearance for the Leeward Islands against the Windward Islands at Warner Park, St Kitts. Batting first, the Windward Islands were dismissed for 122, with Cooper bowling four wicketless overs which conceded 15 runs. In reply, the Leeward Islands made 315 all out in their first-innings, with Cooper ending the innings unbeaten on 3. Responding in their second-innings, the Windward Islands were dismissed for 153, with Cooper taking a single wicket in the innings, that of Windward Islands captain Irvine Shillingford, finishing with figures of 1/32 from fifteen overs. The Leeward Islands won the match by the margin of an innings and 40 runs. He played three minor matches for Montserrat in 1971, before emigrating to Canada.

References

External links
Lennox Cooper at ESPNcricinfo
Lennox Cooper at CricketArchive

Year of birth unknown
Montserratian cricketers
Leeward Islands cricketers